The Nashville ARCA 150 was an Automobile Racing Club of America (ARCA) race at Nashville Superspeedway in Lebanon, Tennessee, held in the spring from 2001 to 2007. For the first six years, the race was known as the ARCA RE/MAX PFG Lester 150. A second race, known as the Waste Management 200 and Toyota ARCA 150, was held in August from 2001 to 2008, after which the track was removed from the series schedule.

Past events
The inaugural ARCA race in 2001 was the very first race held at the track. The $18,695 first-place prize went to Ken Schrader, while female driver Shawna Robinson placed third. The 2001 second-place finisher in the spring, Frank Kimmel, went on to win the next three races at the track.

20022, 20051, 20061, 2008: Race extended due to a green-white-checker finish.
20062: Race shortened due to time constraits.

Multiple winners (drivers)

Manufacturer wins

References

External links
 Official ARCA Website
 Racing-Reference.info – Nashville Superspeedway

2007 in American motorsport
2007 in Tennessee
ARCA Menards Series races
Sports in Nashville, Tennessee
Stock car races